Bobby Johnson (born c. 1973) is an American football coach who is the offensive line coach for the New York Giants of the National Football League (NFL).  Johnson played college football for the Miami RedHawks football team of Miami University.

In January 2018, Johnson was the head coach of the West team in the 2018 East–West Shrine Game.

References

External links 
 Detroit Lions bio
 Buffalo Bills bio

Akron Zips football coaches
Buffalo Bills coaches
Detroit Lions coaches
Indiana Hoosiers football coaches
Jacksonville Jaguars coaches
Living people
Miami RedHawks football coaches
Oakland Raiders coaches
1973 births
Players of American football from Akron, Ohio
Miami RedHawks football players
Indianapolis Colts coaches
New York Giants coaches